Corner Brook Transit is a provider of public transportation to the residents of Corner Brook, Newfoundland and Labrador, Canada. Municipally managed, the service is provided under contract by Murphy Brothers Bus Lines. There are two routes that run from 7am to 6pm Mon-Fri with destinations including Murphy Square and the downtown area. In response to declining ridership, a pilot project is set to be initiated to reformulated the routes.

The transit agency has instituted a NextBus realtime transit location system, which will provide data to internet and cell phone users on vehicle ETAs.

The fleet consists of three gasoline fueled Ford E-Series Cutaway buses. Two of the old diesel buses have been kept as back-ups.

Routes
5 Curling and Grenfell/Windsor/Plaza/Murphy Square - combines former Routes 1 & 2
6  Country/Pratt/Grenfell and Humber/Murphy Square - combines former Routes 3 & 4

See also

 Public transport in Canada

References

External links
Corner Brook Transit homepage

Transit agencies in Newfoundland and Labrador
Corner Brook